Gaz Azar (also Romanized as Gaz Āzār; also known as Gaz Āzār-e Pā’īn) is a village in Rahdar Rural District, in the Central District of Rudan County, Hormozgan Province, Iran. At the 2006 census, its population was 26, in 5 families.

References 

Populated places in Rudan County